XHPALV-FM is a radio station on 100.9 FM in Alto Lucero and Xalapa, Veracruz, Mexico. It is owned by Multimedios Radio and carries its La Lupe variety hits format.

History
Multimedios won XHPALV in the IFT-4 radio auction of 2017 at a cost of 46,000 pesos. The station signed on in the summer of 2018.

All three Multimedios stations in Veracruz flipped from La Caliente to La Lupe on November 6, 2020.

Transmitters
XHPALV-FM signed on with one transmitter at Alto Lucero. A second transmitter was activated in late 2019 at Cerro Macuiltepetl in Xalapa and is now considered the primary.

References

Radio stations in Veracruz
Radio stations established in 2018
2018 establishments in Mexico
Multimedios Radio
Spanish-language radio stations